In physiology, intrapleural pressure refers to the pressure within the pleural cavity. Normally, the pressure within the pleural cavity is slightly less than the atmospheric pressure, which is known as negative pressure. When the pleural cavity is damaged or ruptured and the intrapleural pressure becomes greater than the atmospheric  pressure, pneumothorax may ensue.

Intrapleural pressure is different from intrathoracic pressure. The thoracic cavity is the space that includes the pleura, lungs, and heart, while the pleural space is only the space between the parietal pleura and visceral pleura surrounding lungs.

Intrapleural pressure depends on the ventilation phase, atmospheric pressure, and the volume of the intrapleural cavity.

At rest, there is a negative intrapleural pressure. This provides a transpulmonary pressure, causing the lungs to expand. If humans didn't maintain a slightly negative pressure even when exhaling, their lungs would collapse on themselves because all the air would rush towards the area of lower pressure. Intra-pleural pressure is sub-atmospheric. This is due to the recoil of the chest and lungs away from each other.

Müller's maneuver can temporarily but significantly decrease the intrapleural pressure.

The relationship between the intra-pulmonary pressure and intra-pleural pressure is that the pressure becomes more negative during inspiration and allows air to get sucked in (Boyle's law)  vs  relationship and during expiration, the pressure becomes less negative (Note: still less than atmospheric pressure, also take note of the partial pressure of carbon dioxide) and the air is given out. The only difference between the pressures is that intra-pleural pressure is more negative than intra-pulmonary pressure.

Factors affecting are:

Physiological effects:

 Müller's maneuver (forced inspiration against a closed glottis results in negative pressure)
 
 Deep inspiration

Pathological effects:

 Emphysema
 
 Pneumothorax Condition

A person breathing at rest inhales and exhales approximately half a liter of air during each respiratory cycle, which is called tidal volume. The respiratory rate is directly affected by the concentration of carbon dioxide in the blood. Lungs do not collapse after forceful respiration because of the residual volume.

References

Books

 

Respiratory physiology
Pulmonology